Cindy Swanepoel (born 15 December 1981) is a South African actress. She is best known for her roles in the popular serials Generations, Binnelanders and Egoli: Place of Gold.

Personal life
She was born on 15 December 1981 in Krugersdorp, Transvaal, South Africa and raised in Pretoria. During her high school years, she lived in Cape Town and matriculated at Durbanville High School. In 2003 she obtained her BA Drama honors degree from the University of Stellenbosch.

Career
She made her acting debut as a professional actress in the theater production, Circles in a Forest directed by Marinda Engelbrecht. The show was performed at the Artscape Theater in Cape Town. In 2004, the production was performed at the Klein Karoo National Arts Festival as well. In 2005, she moved from Cape Town to Johannesburg and made her television debut in the television series, Egoli: Place of Gold. In the play, she played the role of 'July'. After the success of the play, she performed in several theatrical productions: Houtkruis directed by Elzette Maarschalk in 2008 and Stephen van Niekerk in 2011. The she joined the productions The Crucible directed by Alby Michaels.

She also joined with several television serials including: The Mating Game, 90 Plein Street and Skeletons in the Closet, as well as the soap opera, 7de Laan, Villa Rosa and Generations. She appeared in the comedy series, Laugh out Loud and Proes Street. Then she acted in the kykNET series, Sterlopers.

In 2010, she originally played the role of 'Chrystal' in the film Getroud met rugby. The film was later expanded to a television series on kykNET. She also starred in the films Nation's Garage, The Street's Bull and Ballad for a Single. In 2011, she founded the film production company, 'Pôkô Events and Productions' with two partners. The company is largely concerns on the productions on children's theater. In 2013 she starred in Curl Up and Dye directed by the lyricist, Sue Pam-Grant. In 2015 she joined with the popular soapie Binnelanders and played the role 'Annelize Roux'. From season 12 in 2016, she became a regular cast of the serial.

Theater plays
 Kringe in ŉ Bos
  'n Tyd om Lief te Hê
 Houtkruis: Die Musical
 Dalliances
 The Crucible
 Curl up and Dye
 My Boetie se Sussie se Ou
 Equus
 Drif
 Mysterious Skin

Filmography

References

External links
 

Living people
South African television actresses
South African film actresses
1981 births
People from Krugersdorp